Posyolok imeni Lenina is a rural locality (a settlement) in Karayashnikovskoye Rural Settlement, Olkhovatsky District, Voronezh Oblast, Russia. The population was 85 as of 2010. There are 4 streets.

Geography 
The settlement is located 32 km north of Olkhovatka (the district's administrative centre) by road. Yurasovka is the nearest rural locality.

References 

Rural localities in Olkhovatsky District